The electoral district of East Hobart, sometimes referred to as Hobart East, is an electoral district of the Tasmanian House of Assembly. It is based in Tasmania's capital city, Hobart and has been historically difficult to find.

The seat was created as a single-member seat ahead of the 1871 election following the dissolution of the multi-member Hobart Town seat. It was temporarily abolished at the 1886 election when neighbouring seats absorbed its area and became two-member seats.

The seat was then recreated as a single-member seat at the 1903 election and remained East Hobart when the Tasmanian parliament adopted the Hare-Clark electoral model for the entire state in 1909.

Members for East Hobart
First incarnation: 1871–1886

Second incarnation: 1903–1909

References
 
 
 Parliament of Tasmania (2006). The Parliament of Tasmania from 1956

Hobart East